BNN may refer to:
Badan Narkotika Nasional, a national anti-narcotics agency in Indonesia
Banana News Network, a comedy TV Show
Baltic News Network, a business news portal
Bart's Neverending Network (BNN), a radio and television broadcasting organization in the Netherlands
Bayesian neural network, a kind of artificial neural network
Binary neural network, a kind of artificial neural network
Boston Neighborhood Network
Business News Network, a Canadian financial news channel
Breaking News Network, a news company in the United States
Brønnøysund Airport, Brønnøy (by IATA code)
The radio navigation station upon which the Bovingdon stack (a section of airspace near London) is located